Euterpe catinga is a palm species in the genus Euterpe. It is found in forests of a dry, sandy soil and very peculiar vegetation, known as catinga forests or Campinarana in northern South America (Guyana, Venezuela, Colombia, Ecuador, Peru, Brazil).

Two varieties are recognized:

Euterpe catinga var. catinga - Venezuela, Colombia, Peru, northern Brazil
Euterpe catinga var. roraimae (Dammer) A.J.Hend. & Galeano - Guyana, Venezuela, Ecuador, Peru, Brazil

References

catinga
Flora of South America
Plants described in 1853